Croydon is a town and locality within the Shire of Croydon in Queensland, Australia. It is a terminus for the Normanton to Croydon railway line, which operates the Gulflander tourist train.

History
Mining in the area quickly drove out the Tagalaka people indigenous to the area. The town's name is derived from a pastoral run name, that was used by their sons, Alexander Brown and William Chalmers Brown, pastoralists; William Chalmers Brown was born in Croydon, England in 1841 and is buried at Toowong cemetery in Brisbane. Gold was discovered in 1885 and by 1887, the town's population had reached 7,000. Croydon Post Office opened on 20 March 1886.

Croydon State School was established on 12 September 1889 but did not open until 7 July 1890.

Gold was to be the main economic production of the area for four decades. The Mining Warden left in 1926 as there were too few miners left on the field. During its heyday, Croydon was the fourth largest town in the colony of Queensland.

In 1917, Dr. Elkington, Director of the Division of Tropical Hygiene, Commonwealth Department of Health, was concerned about health and hygiene of its growing population, contemplated conducting a statistical and social survey of the town, which did not eventuate. Elkington's interest in sociological surveys of gathering social and economic details on a population later developed into the 1924 Sociological Survey of White Women conducted from the Institute of Tropical Medicine in Townsville.

Currently, Croydon has a much smaller population, having greatly decreased following the end of the gold rush. The population is now a few hundred people. The town is one of the termini for the Gulflander railway, opened for the gold rush in 1891 but now a tourist railway operated by Traveltrain. In early 2009, the close proximity of a receding cyclone ex-Cyclone Charlotte, caused torrential rain and Croydon to be flooded. An estimated $5 million of damage was made to town infrastructure.

Road infrastructure
National Highway 1 runs through from east to west.

The Richmond-Croydon Road runs along part of the eastern boundary.

Climate

Croydon experiences a hot semi-arid climate, bordering on a tropical savanna climate (Köppen: BSh/Aw, Trewartha: BShb/Awhb), with a very hot, oppressively humid wet season from December to March; and a long, hot dry season from April to November.

Heritage listings 

Croydon has a number of heritage-listed sites, including:
 Croydon: Homeward Bound Battery and Dam
 Gulf Developmental Road: Content Mine
 Gulf Developmental Road: Richmond Mine and Battery
 Helen Street: Croydon railway station
 Julia Creek Road: Croydon Cemetery
 Normanton (Gulf Developmental) Road: Golden Gate Mining and Town Complex
 Normanton Road: Station Creek Cemetery
 Normanton to Croydon: Normanton to Croydon railway line
 Off Gulf Developmental Road: Chinese Temple and Settlement Site
 Samwell Street: Court House
 Samwell Street: Croydon Shire Hall (formerly Croydon Town Hall)
 Samwell Street: Police Station
 Sircom Street: Croydon Hospital Ward
 Tabletop Cemetery
 West of the railway station: Old Croydon Cemetery

Facilities

Croydon has a swimming pool, golf course, lawn bowls, a museum, a tourist information centre, caravan park and a primary school. The Croydon Shire Council operates a public library at 63 Samwell Street.

Croydon State School is a government primary school (years P-6) in Brown Street. In 2014, it had 42 students enrolled with 2 classes (years P-3 and years 4-6) with 3 teachers.

Water supply is sourced from Lake Belmore.

St Margaret's Church at Lot 9, Alldridge Street is shared by the Anglican and Catholic congregations. It is within the Gulf Savannah Parish of the Roman Catholic Diocese of Cairns.

In popular culture
Croydon was mentioned in the 1950 novel A Town Like Alice by Nevil Shute, as an example of a largely abandoned gold rush town.

Australian Country music singer-songwriter Jamey Fitzgerald had lived in Croydon during his teen age years and early adulthood. In 2012 he was featured on SBS discussing music and life living in the town.

References

External links

 University of Queensland: Queensland Places: Croydon and Croydon Shire
 

 
Towns in Queensland
North West Queensland
Shire of Croydon
Localities in Queensland